Anatragus is a genus of longhorn beetles of the subfamily Lamiinae, containing the following species:

 Anatragus ornatus Kolbe, 1897
 Anatragus pulchellus (Westwood, 1845)

References

Tragocephalini